The Pittsburgh Pirates are a Major League Baseball (MLB) franchise based in Pittsburgh, Pennsylvania. They play in the National League Central division. Since the establishment of the Rule 4 Draft the Pirates have selected 72 players in the first round. Officially known as the "First-Year Player Draft", the Rule 4 Draft is MLB's primary mechanism for assigning players from high schools, colleges, and other amateur clubs to its franchises. The draft order is determined based on the previous season's standings, with the team possessing the worst record receiving the first pick. In addition, teams which lost free agents in the previous off-season may be awarded compensatory or supplementary picks.

Of these 72 players, 27 have been pitchers, the most of any position; 20 of these were right-handed, while 7 were left-handed. 17 outfielders and 15 shortstops were selected. The Pirates have also drafted 7 catchers, 3 first basemen, and 3 third basemen, but have never selected a second baseman in the first round. Eleven players came from high schools or universities in the state of California, while eight came from Florida.

Three Pirates' first-round picks have won championships with the franchise. Richie Hebner (1966) won a World Series title on the 1971 championship team, and Steve Nicosia (1973) and Dale Berra (1975) won with the 1979 team (though Berra did not appear in the World Series). No Pirates' first-round pick has ever won the Rookie of the Year Award. None of their picks have been elected to the Baseball Hall of Fame, but Barry Bonds (1985) won seven Most Valuable Player awards, more than any other player, including two with Pittsburgh. Bonds also won 12 Silver Sluggers, 8 Gold Gloves, and  holds both the single-season and career home run records (73 and 762). The Pirates have made fourteen selections in the supplemental round of the draft and have made the first overall selection five times (1986, 1996, 2002, 2011, 2021). The Pirates will also have the first overall pick in the upcoming 2023 Major League Baseball draft after winning the inaugural draft lottery.

The Pirates have failed 3 times in signing a first-round draft pick. This first occurred in 2012, when the Pirates selected RHP Mark Appel from Stanford University, who sought a significant bonus which, according to new MLB rules, would have cost the Pirates a future draft pick. The Pirates received the 9th overall pick in the 2013 draft for their failure to sign Appel.

Pedro Álvarez (2009) nearly went unsigned as he faced a contentious process in which Álvarez and the Pirates reached an initial deal after the signing deadline (with permission from MLB); his agent Scott Boras and the Players Association filed a grievance challenging this post-deadline deal, and ultimately the Pirates renegotiated a deal with him in September that year. The Pirates have had ten compensatory picks overall since the first draft in 1965. These additional picks are provided when a team loses a particularly valuable free agent in the previous off-season, or, more recently, if a team fails to sign a draft pick from the previous year.

Key

Picks

See also
Pittsburgh Pirates minor league players

Footnotes
 Through the 2012 draft, free agents were evaluated by the Elias Sports Bureau and rated "Type A", "Type B", or not compensation-eligible. If a team offered arbitration to a player but that player refused and subsequently signed with another team, the original team was able to receive additional draft picks. If a "Type A" free agent left in this way, his previous team received a supplemental pick and a compensatory pick from the team with which he signed. If a "Type B" free agent left in this way, his previous team received only a supplemental pick. Since the 2013 draft, free agents are no longer classified by type; instead, compensatory picks are only awarded if the team offered its free agent a contract worth at least the average of the 125 current richest MLB contracts. However, if the free agent's last team acquired the player in a trade during the last year of his contract, it is ineligible to receive compensatory picks for that player.
The Pirates gained a compensatory first-round pick in 1978 from the Los Angeles Dodgers as compensation for losing free agent Terry Forster.
The Pirates lost their first-round pick in 1979 to the Los Angeles Dodgers as compensation for signing free agent Lee Lacy.
The Pirates gained a compensatory first-round pick in 1980 from the Los Angeles Angels as compensation for losing free agent Bruce Kison.
The Pirates gained a supplemental first-round pick in 1990 for losing free agent Jim Gott.
The Pirates gained a supplemental first-round pick in 1992 for losing free agent Bobby Bonilla.
The Pirates gained a supplemental first-round pick in 1993 for losing free agent Doug Drabek.
The Pirates gained a supplemental first-round pick in 1993 for losing free agent Barry Bonds.
The Pirates gained a supplemental first-round pick in 2009 for failing to sign Tanner Scheppers.
The Pirates gained a supplemental first-round pick in 2012 for losing free agent Ryan Doumit.
The Pirates gained a supplemental first-round pick in 2013 for failing to sign Mark Appel.
Competitive Balance pick
The Pirates gained a compensatory first-round pick in 2015 for losing free agent Russell Martin.
Competitive Balance pick
Competitive Balance pick
Competitive Balance pick
Competitive Balance pick
Competitive Balance pick

References
General references

In-text citations

First-round draft picks
Major League Baseball first-round draft picks